Trzebośnica is a left tributary of the San River in southeastern Poland. Its length is 35.3 kilometres. It flows into the San near Sarzyna.

Rivers of Poland
Rivers of Podkarpackie Voivodeship